Gamma-aminobutyric acid receptor subunit gamma-2 is a protein that in humans is encoded by the GABRG2 gene.

Function 
Gamma-aminobutyric acid (GABA), the major inhibitory neurotransmitter in the brain, mediates neuronal inhibition by binding to GABA receptors. The type A GABA receptors are pentameric chloride channels assembled from among many genetic variants of GABA(A) subunits. This gene encodes the gamma 2 subunit of GABA(A) receptor. Mutations in this gene have been associated with epilepsy and febrile seizures. Alternative splicing of this gene results in transcript variants encoding different isoforms.

Interactions 
GABRG2 has been shown to interact with GABARAP and Dopamine receptor D5.

See also 
 GABAA receptor

References

Further reading 

 
 
 
 
 
 
 
 
 
 
 
 
 
 
 
 
 
 
 
 

Ion channels